Orr's Rifles was a South Carolina infantry regiment that served in the Confederate States Army during the American Civil War.

History

Formation
On 20 July 1861, James Lawrence Orr organized the First South Carolina Rifle Regiment at Sandy Springs. He was elected Colonel; J. Foster Marshall was elected Lt. Colonel, and Daniel A. Ledbetter, Major. Ten companies were recruited in the following districts (counties were known as districts between 1800 & 1868)

The regiment had seen no action by the time Orr left, but the name "Orr's Rifles" stuck throughout the war.

Initial duty
First posted to Sullivan's Island, SC to defend Charleston Harbor, others called them the "Pound Cake Regiment" in reference to their "light" garrison duty. The 20th SC Infantry was referred to as the "Poundcake Brigade" on account of limited engagements and they were so close to home, their families could bring them poundcake or other treats.

Transfer to Army of Northern Virginia
In April 1862, the full-strength 1,000-man unit was transferred to Robert E. Lee’s Army of Northern Virginia (ANV). In June, it was incorporated into Gregg's Brigade, of A.P. Hill's Light Division, of Thomas J. "Stonewall" Jackson Corps (often termed the "Left Wing" early in the war).

Surrender

Lee surrendered the ANV, including Orr's Rifles, at Appomattox Court House on 9 April 1865. After three years of combat, the regiment comprised 9 officers and 148 enlisted men.

See also
List of South Carolina Confederate Civil War units

References

 Regiment details
 National Park Service
 FamilySearch.org 
 South Carolina Civil War Relic Room & Military Museum: includes picture of the Regiment's flag
 South Carolina Genealogical Society
 Regiment rosters
 National Park Service
 Ancestry.com

Units and formations of the Confederate States Army from South Carolina
1861 establishments in South Carolina
Military units and formations established in 1861